Adamstown Rosebud Football Club, an association football club based in Adamstown, New South Wales, Newcastle, was founded in 1889. They became the second Newcastle member admitted into the National Soccer League in 1984 after the demise of Newcastle KB United. The club's name was changed to Newcastle Rosebud United during their time in the National Soccer League before changing back to Adamstown Rosebud. The club's first team has competed in numerous nationally and internationally organised competitions, and all players who have played at least one match are listed below (in National Soccer League or NSL Cup).

Ralph Maier holds the record for the greatest number of appearances for Adamstown Rosebud. Between 1984 and 1986 the Australian defender played 79 times for the club. The club's goalscoring record is held by Derek Todd, who scored 15 goals in all competitions between 1984 and 1985.

Key
 The list is ordered first by date of debut, and then if necessary in alphabetical order.
 Appearances as a substitute are included.

Players

References
General
 

Specific

Adamstown Rosebud FC players
Adamstown Rosebud
Association football player non-biographical articles